is a public university in the city of Hakodate, Hokkaidō, Japan, established in 2000. The university's School of Systems Information Science is separated into two departments: the Department of Media Architecture and the Department of Complex and Intelligent Systems.

References

External links
Official site 

Public universities in Japan
Universities and colleges in Hokkaido
Engineering universities and colleges in Japan
Educational institutions established in 2000
2000 establishments in Japan